Here the Dark is a 2020 book by David Bergen.

After a successful career as a novelist, Bergen returns to his original genre, short fiction. This book contains a novella and seven short stories that span his writing career.

The book was shortlisted for the Giller Prize in 2020. The book won the 2021 McNally Robinson Book of the Year Award.

References

2020 Canadian novels
2020 short story collections
Canadian novellas
Canadian short story collections